Decision Games is a wargaming company founded by Christopher Cummins that publishes Strategy & Tactics magazine. The company has bought the rights to many Simulations Publications games and is reprinting many of them, as well as creating new, original games that vary in complexity.

The company publishes several magazines, which include:
 Strategy & Tactics, which includes a game covering various military events in every issue;
 World at War, which covers World War II and also includes a game in every issue;
 Modern War, which covers the period since World War II and hypothetical future wars and also includes a game in every issue;

History
The company was founded in 1988. In 1989, it started Desert Fox Games, which specialized in selling new and used wargames from various companies.

Games

Games published by Decision Games include:

Printed Board Games
 Across Suez
 Advanced European Theater of Operations
 Battle for Germany
 War in Europe
 Wacht Am Rhein
 Atlantic Wall
 Hurtgen Forest

Computer Conversions
 D-Day at Omaha Beach
 D-Day at Tarawa
 War in Europe
 RAF: Lion

Original Digital Games 
 Nuts! The Battle of the Bulge
 Battles of the Ancient World
 Congo Merc

References

External links
 

Game manufacturers
Wargame companies
Board game publishing companies